The 2001 DFB-Ligapokal was the fifth edition of the DFB-Ligapokal. Hertha BSC won the competition, beating Schalke 04 4–1 in the final. Hertha had ended Bayern Munich's dominance of the competition by beating them in the semi-finals.

Participating clubs
A total of six teams qualified for the competition. The labels in the parentheses show how each team qualified for the place of its starting round:
1st, 2nd, 3rd, 4th, etc.: League position
CW: Cup winners
TH: Title holders

Matches

Preliminary round

Semi-finals

Final

References

2001
Ligapokal